RING finger protein 135 is a protein that in humans is encoded by the RNF135 gene.

The protein encoded by this gene contains a RING finger domain, a motif present in a variety of functionally distinct proteins and known to be involved in protein-protein and protein-DNA interactions. This gene is located in a chromosomal region known to be frequently deleted in patients with neurofibromatosis. Alternatively spliced transcript variants encoding distinct isoforms have been reported.

Interactions
RNF135 has been shown to interact with RARRES3.

References

Further reading

RING finger proteins